The Graduate School of Business (GSB) is the business school of the University of Cape Town (UCT), South Africa's oldest university.

The School's programme includes the Masters in Business Administration (MBA), the Executive MBA, and the Postgraduate Diploma in Management Practice (PgDip)  – each targeting a different level of management.

Executive Education at the GSB offers open-enrolment short courses, focusing on a wide range of development requirements. The department also develops short courses and customised programme for corporate clients.

History and Location
The UCT Graduate School of Business is one of the oldest business schools in the country, having been established in 1964 on the University of Cape Town's main campus in Rondebosch, Cape Town.

Since 1991,the GSB has had its home at the Breakwater Campus at the Victoria and Alfred Waterfront, close to Cape Town's central business district. The campus, which was once a prison, derives its name from the fact that the site previously housed the convicts who built the Cape Town harbour breakwater in 1861. The architecture and interior design of the campus incorporates many of the original features, including former prison cells used as offices and meeting rooms.

Accreditation/ Rankings

QS Global 200 Business Schools Report: The report, which rates schools from around the world based on MBA employers’ and recruiters’ views, rated the UCT GSB in first place for Africa and the Middle East region.

AMBA: The GSB has received AMBA accreditation from the Association of MBAs (AMBA). AMBA is the international impartial authority on postgraduate MBA education. The accreditation is considered the global benchmark for MBA, DBA and MBM programme.

EQUIS: The GSB has been awarded accreditation by the European Foundation for Management Development (EFMD). This means the GSB has a three-year European Quality Improvement System (EQUIS) accreditation. EQUIS is an international system of quality assessment, improvement, and accreditation of higher education institutions in management and business administration. The GSB is one of two African business schools to have received an EQUIS accreditation.

AABS: The GSB is one of six South African business schools to belong to the Association of African Business Schools (AABS) – an organization that aims to promote excellence in business and management education on the continent by supporting business schools through capacity building, collaboration, and quality improvement.

AACSB:  provides internationally recognized, specialized accreditation for business and accounting programs at the bachelor's, master's, and doctoral level. With this addition to their accreditations, UCT GSB is the 59th school worldwide to gain "Triple Crown" status.

Financial Times: The GSB MBA programme is the only African MBA programme to be placed on the Financial Times Global Top 100 MBA Rankings. In 2013, the School was placed at 74. The school's MBA is ranked the second best-value-for-money MBA in the world.

Youth Inc: The GSB was ranked 44th in the Youth Inc Global Business School Ranking 2012 Top 100 MBAs, the only African business school to feature.

Which MBA?: The GSB was ranked 59 in The Economist's list of executive MBA programme 2013, the only African business school to make it into the EMBA ranking.

Specialist Centres
Bertha Centre 
In 2012 the Bertha Centre started the Social Innovation Lab, a stream on the MBA programme to promote the social purpose of business in the next generation of entrepreneurs and business leaders.

Allan Gray Centre for Values-Based Leadership
The UCT Graduate School of Business (GSB) in association with the Allan Gray Orbis Foundation established a Centre in Values-based Leadership at the GSB that is committed to exploring new ways of doing business based on purpose, sustainability and responsible practices. The center is the first of its kind in South Africa and it seeks to raise issues of sustainability and values-based leadership to priority status in the country and beyond. It has been established through sponsorship from Allan WB Gray, founder of Allan Gray Limited and the co-founder of Allan Gray Orbis Foundation.

Centre for Coaching
The Centre for Coaching has initiated a partnership with New Ventures West and The Weathervane to develop courses with international accreditation and practices. Coaching to Excellence, Associate Coaching and Professional Coaching are the most prominent courses offered by the center.

Managing Infrastructure Reform and Regulation
The Management Programme in Infrastructure Reform and Regulation (MIR) aims to build capacity to manage reform and regulation of infrastructure sectors throughout Africa and in other emerging economies. MIR works in support of sustainable development and is currently focusing on the electricity and water sectors. The centre conducts research, offers short courses, and provides professional support and policy advocacy.

Faculty
The GSB has 41 resident faculty members. Many are internationally acclaimed as researchers and teachers. Others are involved in national and regional issues as well as in policy formulation and implementation. The School's core faculty is supplemented by international visiting academics and executives.

Dr Catherine Duggan is the current director of the University of Cape Town Graduate School of Business (UCT GSB).

Research
The School has identified five interdisciplinary themes around which it seeks to focus its research. These are:
 Governance in emerging economies and the impact on economic development
 Culture, diversity and dynamics
 Entrepreneurial development and sustainable business
 Development, innovation and technology
 Infrastructure and regulation.

Programmes
MBA

The GSB MBA is one of the oldest management programmes in South Africa and has been producing graduates for almost four decades.

The curriculum is international in scope and standard but with a distinctive orientation to the (South) African context. It has a strong practical emphasis and in addition to addressing the functional areas of business, new streams of learning around communication, leadership and entrepreneurship keep it at the cutting edge of professional development.

At 11 months, the full-time UCT MBA programme is one of the shortest around and it is known for its intensity. The programme is also available in a modular format to accommodate students who wish to continue working while they pursue their studies.

Executive MBA

The Executive MBA is not a modular version of the MBA programme. Although the academic qualification is the same, the process of learning and content are different.

The Executive MBA is the only programme in South Africa that is targeted at senior and executive managers and leaders. The course uses learning techniques that are designed to develop critical thinking, decision-making abilities and a capacity to function in complex organisational and social environments. Students acquire a deeper understanding of management from an international perspective.

Associate in Management(AIM)

AIM was launched in 1991 in order to fast-track working black South Africans who, because of the history of apartheid, lacked the formal qualifications they needed to climb the corporate ladder. Although taught at a postgraduate level, the programme does not require applicants to have an undergraduate degree or even a matric certificate, and recognises work experience and aptitude as prior learning.

Postgraduate Diploma in Business Administration (PDBA)

The PDBA is a management development programme at pre-masters level and can act as a bridging course for students who may not meet the entrance requirements of the MBA programme.

Masters in Development Finance

The UCT GSB, in partnership with Africa growth Institute (AGI), is offering an MPhil (Development Finance) which aims to enable students to meet the development needs of the continent.

PHD Programme

The GSB runs a comprehensive PhD programme to encourage original research at the business school that fits the school's research agenda.

Executive Education

The department offers a range of short courses that are open to public enrolment. The selection of specialist short courses cover a spectrum of interests, ranging from general management issues to those that are industry-specific, such as electricity regulation.

Customised Education

The UCT GSB also offers programmes that are customised for corporates, government, NGOs and SETAs. Programmes are modular and accredited national qualifications can be customised to suit a client's specific needs.

Corporations with which Executive Education continues to work vary in size, sector, focus and challenge. Examples of those it has worked with include Metropolitan Holdings, ABSA, BHP Billiton, Nestle SA, Johnson & Johnson, South African Breweries, and Standard Bank.

Other Initiatives

GSB Solution Space

The Solution Space is an ecosystem for early-stage start-ups and a research and development platform for corporates. The Solution Space was founded in 2014 at the University of Cape Town Graduate School of Business. The university's Vice Chancellors Strategic Award provided initial capital, and founding partner, the MTN Group, provided significant support from 2015.

See also
 Centre for Curating the Archive
 List of universities in South Africa
 Education in South Africa
 Chancellor of the University of Cape Town

References

Sources
Statute of the University of Cape Town, Government Notice No. 1199, 20 September 2002.

External links
UCT GSB website

Business schools in South Africa
Educational institutions established in 1964
Graduate School of Business
1964 establishments in South Africa